John Patrick Marcus Kavanagh (12 July 1879 – 6 July 1964) was a socialist leader in Canada and Australia. He was leader of the Socialist Party of Canada from 1908 to 1921. At the founding meeting of the Worker's Party of Canada, which was the public face of the underground Communist Party of Canada, in February 1922, he was elected to the National Executive Committee of the party.

Kavanagh moved to Australia in 1925, and was a central leader of the Communist Party of Australia until 1930, when the Stalinist Comintern removed him from the leadership. He was expelled from the party in January 1931, readmitted, and then expelled a second time in 1934 after being accused of Trotskyism. In 1940, Kavanagh joined the Communist League of Australia which was the Australian section of the Fourth International.

His wife's name was Kylsea, and he had one brother, Quinn.

External links

Jack Kavanagh joins the Fourth International (1940) Article by Kavanagh on his decision to join  the Trotskyist movement.

References

Australian Trotskyists
Communist Party of Canada politicians
Canadian Marxists
Canadian Trotskyists
1879 births
1961 deaths
Canadian emigrants to Australia
Communist Party of Australia members
Irish emigrants to Canada (before 1923)